The Sandlot (released in some countries as The Sandlot Kids) is a 1993 American coming-of-age sports comedy film co-written, directed, and narrated by David Mickey Evans. It tells the story of a group of young baseball players during the summer of 1962. It stars Tom Guiry, Mike Vitar, Karen Allen, Denis Leary, and James Earl Jones. The movie is set in the San Fernando Valley in Los Angeles, CA and the filming locations were in Midvale, Salt Lake City, and Ogden, Utah. It grossed $34 million worldwide and has since become a cult film.

Plot
In the summer of 1962, fifth-grader Scott Smalls moves to the San Fernando Valley. His mother encourages him to make friends, and he tries to join a group of boys who play baseball daily at the neighborhood sandlot — brothers first baseman Timmy and right outfielder Tommy "The Repeater" Timmons, shortstop Michael "Squints" Palledorous, third baseman Alan "Yeah-Yeah" McClennan, second baseman Bertram Grover Weeks, pitcher Kenny "The Heater" DeNunez, catcher Hamilton "Ham" Porter, and their leader and best player Benjamin Franklin "Benny" Rodriguez. Everyone but Benny laughs at Smalls' lack of ability, and an attempt to play catch with his stepfather Bill leaves Smalls with a black eye. Nevertheless, Benny invites him onto the team as a left outfielder, and helps him earn the boys' respect.

When Ham hits a home run into an adjacent backyard, the team stops Smalls from retrieving the ball and tells him of "the Beast", a legendarily fearsome English Mastiff living behind the fence. Many baseballs over the years have been claimed by the Beast, which is kept chained up by its owner, Mr. Mertle. One particulaly hot day, the team hits the pool, in lieu of baseball, where Squints fakes drowning to receive mouth-to-mouth resuscitation from lifeguard Wendy Peffercorn; he kisses her, and she kicks the boys out, but it cements hers and Squints' relationship. The team plays a Fourth of July night game by the light of fireworks, and Smalls observes that, to Benny, "baseball was life". They later win against a rival Little League team and celebrate at a fair, where a combination of chewing tobacco obtained by Bertram and riding the Trabant causes them to vomit everywhere.

One day, Benny hits the cover off the team's only ball. With Bill away on business, Smalls borrows his prized baseball autographed by Babe Ruth. Unaware of its value, he hits his first home run, sending it into the Beast's yard. Smalls panics after learning of the significance of Ruth's autograph from the other boys and the team (after forging Babe Ruth's signature on another baseball as a temporary replacement to keep Small's mother from noticing) attempts to recover the ball with various makeshift devices, but each is destroyed by the Beast. That night, Benny dreams of the spirit of Babe Ruth, who advises him to rescue the ball himself: "Heroes get remembered, but legends never die. Follow your heart, kid, and you'll never go wrong".
 
Equipped with a new pair of PF Flyers, Benny retrieves the ball by "pickling" the Beast and leaping back over the fence, but the dog breaks its chain and chases him through town. Benny races back to Mr. Mertle's yard, but the Beast crashes through the fence, which falls down on top of it. Smalls and Benny free the dog, who gratefully licks Smalls' face and leads them to its stash of baseballs. They meet Mr. Mertle, who turns out to have been a baseball player and friend of Babe Ruth, having lost his sight after being struck by a pitch. He kindly trades them the chewed-up ball for one autographed by all the 1927 New York Yankees, and asks them to visit every week to talk baseball.

Bill loves the "Murderers' Row" ball, but still grounds Smalls for a week for taking and ruining the signed ball. Their relationship improves and Smalls begins to call him "Dad". The boys continue to play on the sandlot, with the Beast – whose real name is Hercules – as their mascot, but eventually go their separate ways: Yeah-Yeah goes on to join the army and develop bungee jumping; Bertram disappears into the counterculture movement; Timmy and Tommy become an architect and contractor, and the two become wealthy upon inventing mini-malls; Squints marries Wendy and the two have children and become the owners of the local drug store; Ham becomes a professional wrestler known as "The Great Hambino"; DeNunez plays triple-A baseball and later becomes a business owner, and coaches his sons' Little League team called "The Heaters"; and Benny earns the nickname "the Jet".

As an adult, Smalls becomes a sports commentator and remains friends with Benny, now a player for the Los Angeles Dodgers. Performing the play-by-play for a Dodgers game, Smalls cheers Benny on as he steals home to win the game, and they give each other the same thumbs-up sign they have shared since childhood.

Cast

Reception

Critical response 
The Sandlot received generally positive reviews upon release. On Rotten Tomatoes, the film holds an approval rating of 64% based on 58 reviews, with an average rating of 6.10/10. The site's critical consensus read: "It may be shamelessly derivative and overly nostalgic, but The Sandlot is nevertheless a genuinely sweet and funny coming-of-age adventure". Metacritic assigned the film had a weighted average score of 55 based on 27 critics, indicating "mixed or average reviews". Audiences polled by CinemaScore gave the film an average grade of "B+" on an A+ to F scale.

Critic Roger Ebert gave the film three stars, comparing the film to a summertime version of A Christmas Story, based on the tone and narration of both films: "There was a moment in the film when Rodriguez hit a line drive directly at the pitcher's mound, and I ducked and held up my mitt, and then I realized I didn't have a mitt, and it was then I also realized how completely this movie had seduced me with its memories of what really matters when you are 12". Bob Cannon of Entertainment Weekly gave the film a B+, praising its simplicity and strong fundamentals.

Leonard Klady of Variety gave the film a mostly negative review. He praised the cinematography and score, but felt the baseball team did not come together, and that the film, while sincere, was a "remarkably shallow wade, rife with incident and slim on substance".

Box office 
The film grossed $4,000,000 in its opening week-end and a further $32,000,000 through ticket sales. Figures for world-wide VHS and DVD sales are estimated to be at $76,000,000. Since its release on both VHS and DVD, the film has become a cult favorite.

Defamation suit 
In 1998, Michael Polydoros sued 20th Century Fox and the producers of the film for defamation. Polydoros, a childhood classmate of David Mickey Evans, the writer and director of The Sandlot, claimed that the character Michael "Squints" Palledorous was derogatory and caused him shame and humiliation. The trial court found in favor of the film-makers, and that finding was affirmed by the California Court of Appeal. After initially agreeing to review the case in 1998, the Supreme Court of California reversed its decision, dismissing the review and reinstating the Court of Appeal's opinion in favor of 20th Century Fox.

Home media
In 1993, The Sandlot first came to home video in a slipcase, along with the LaserDisc in widescreen, but later came in a clam shell case in 1994. On January 29, 2002, the DVD was released under Fox's Family Feature banner, in widescreen (Side B) and full screen (Side A); the 2013 repackaged DVD is widescreen only. The film was released on Blu-ray for the first time in March 2013 to celebrate its 20th anniversary. The film then had a re-release on Blu-ray and Digital HD on March 27, 2018, as part of the film's 25th anniversary.

Sequels and prequel 
 The Sandlot 2 (2005) – a direct-to-video sequel in which a new Sandlot gang is featured. The only returning cast member is James Earl Jones as Mr. Mertle. Evans also returned to direct the sequel and voiced Smalls' younger brother, Johnnie.
 The Sandlot: Heading Home (2007) – another direct-to-video sequel starring Luke Perry as Tommy "Santa" Santorelli who gets knocked back to 1976 from 2005 and relives his childhood. Chauncey Leopardi reprises his role as Squints.
 A prequel film was announced in July 2018.
 As of 2019, a TV series with the original cast is in the works for Disney+, as a result of Disney's acquisition of 20th Century Fox.

Soundtrack 
The film's original score was composed by David Newman, and was not released until 2006, when a limited edition was released as part of the Varèse Sarabande CD Club. This release paired it with selections from Newman's score for The War of the Roses. A complete release devoted exclusively to the score in observance of the film's 25th anniversary by La-La Land Records in 2018.

References

Further reading

External links 

 
 
 

1993 films
1990s sports comedy films
1990s buddy comedy films
1990s coming-of-age comedy films
20th Century Fox films
American baseball films
American coming-of-age films
Films about dogs
Films set in the 1960s
Films set in 1962
Films set in the San Fernando Valley
Films shot in Salt Lake City
Films directed by David M. Evans
Films scored by David Newman
Films with screenplays by David Mickey Evans
20th Century Studios franchises
1993 directorial debut films
1993 comedy films
American children's comedy films
Cultural depictions of Babe Ruth
1990s English-language films
1990s American films